Egres Abbey was a Cistercian monastery in the Kingdom of Hungary, located in Egres (present-day Igriș, part of the commune of Sânpetru Mare, Timiș County, Romania). The Egres Abbey was founded by Béla III of Hungary in 1179 as a filial abbey of Pontigny. Here is attested the oldest library in the territory of present-day Romania.

Here was buried king Andrew II of Hungary and his second wife, Yolanda de Courtenay.

References
 Magister Rogerius, Carmen miserabile
 Novák Lajos, Az egresi cisterci apátság története ("History of the Cistercian Abbey of Egres"), Budapest, 1892.
 Christopher Mielke, No Country for old Women. Burial Practices of Hungarian Queens (975-1301), University of Maryland 2010, p. 28 et. seq.

Cistercian monasteries in Hungary
1179 establishments in Europe
Religious organizations established in the 1170s
Banat
Christian monasteries established in the 12th century
Burial sites of the Capetian House of Courtenay